Elkridge Farm, is a historic slave plantation located in Ellicott City in Howard County, Maryland, United States.

In 1913, James Booker Clark built a mansion resembling the White House to house seven children. James Booker was the son of James Clark, Jr., a Confederate soldier who went into the livestock and banking trade after the war. Senator James A. Clark, Jr. was a nephew who traveled to the property regularly from Keewaydin Farm, down the unimproved Montgomery Road. The plantation house was destroyed by fire on 2 July 1920, with a cracked water reservoir, at a time when James Booker Clark was facing litigation against his family, Garnett Y Clark, for a failed coal mine project. A Target store in Long Gate shopping center now occupies the site.

See also
Hilton, Maryland
Wheatfield (Ellicott City, Maryland)
Keewaydin Farm

References

Buildings and structures in Ellicott City, Maryland
1920 fires in the United States
Plantations in Maryland
Burned buildings and structures in the United States
1913 establishments in Maryland
Houses completed in 1913
Buildings and structures demolished in 1920